Sir Joseph Holmes Miller  (12 February 1919 – 6 February 1986) was a notable New Zealand surveyor, Antarctic explorer and conservationist. He was born in Waimate, New Zealand, on 12 February 1919.

In May 1958, Miller was awarded the Polar Medal, and a month later in the 1958 Queen's Birthday Honours, he was appointed an Officer of the Order of the British Empire, in recognition of his role as deputy leader of the New Zealand Trans-Antarctic Expedition. In the 1979 New Year Honours, he was knighted as a Knight Bachelor, for services to the Ross Dependency, conservation and surveying.

The Miller Range in Antarctica is named in his honour.

References

1919 births
1986 deaths
New Zealand surveyors
New Zealand conservationists
People from Waimate
New Zealand Officers of the Order of the British Empire
New Zealand Knights Bachelor
New Zealand and the Antarctic
New Zealand recipients of the Polar Medal